Marko Dević (born 27 October 1983) is a retired football player.

A naturalized Ukrainian citizen since 2008, Serbian-born Dević made his international debut for his adopted country in 2008.  He has since earned over 30 caps and scored 7 international goals for Ukraine. In 2013, he became the first player to score a hat-trick for the Ukraine national football team in an official match.

Club career

Early career
Born in Belgrade (Serbia, SFR Yugoslavia), Dević started his career at his hometown club Zvezdara, making 14 appearances and scoring twice in the 2001–02 season, during which time the club got relegated from the top division. He later played for Železnik, Radnički Beograd and Voždovac, all in Serbia. He spent just one year at each of the clubs. He scored three goals in 20 appearances for Železnik, including one goal in 19 league appearances and two goals in one cup match. He scored once in 16 appearances for Radnički, before joining Voždovac where he scored four times in 14 appearances.

Ukraine

Volyn Lutsk
In 2005, Ukrainian club Volyn Lutsk acquired Dević. During the 2004–05 Ukrainian Premier League season, he made 14 appearances but failed to score a single goal as Volyn finished in 8th position. The following season he netted twice in 18 league appearances for Volyn. At the end of the season the club was relegated.  Dević made 32 league appearances for Volyn and one cup appearance, scoring two goals.

Metalist Kharkiv

Myron Markevych brought Dević to Vyscha Liha club Metalist Kharkiv. He scored 4 goals in 27 league appearances in his first season as Metalist finished in 3rd position. In the 2007–08 season, he was the Ukrainian Premier League top scorer with 19 goals in 27 matches played. Close behind him were Oleksandr Hladky, Oleksandr Kosyrin and Yevhen Seleznyov, each with 17 goals. Despite Dević's prolific scoring, Metalist finished in third place once again. Dević had a slow start ro the 2008–09 season but in the 13th round he scored both goals in a 2–0 win over Chornomorets Odessa. He finished the season with eight goals from 24 league matches as Metalist again finished third. Metalist also made it to the round of 16 in the UEFA Cup but lost out to another Ukrainian side, Dynamo Kyiv, on away goals after a 3–3 aggregate score. Dević scored eight goals in 24 league appearances in the 2008–09 season, with Metalist finishing in 3rd place. In the 2009–10 season he netted eight times in 20 league appearances as Metalist finished third. In the 2010–11 season Dević topped the assist table for the season with 9 assists. He also managed 14 goals in 24 league appearances to become the second highest goal scorer behind Yevhen Seleznyov of Dnipro, helping Metalist to a 3rd-place finish.
The 2011–12 season saw Dević score 11 goals from 26 league matches as Metalist finished 3rd for the sixth season in a row. Metalist also progressed to the quarter final stage of the Europa League, losing out to Portuguese side Sporting 3–2 on aggregate. Dević scored five goals and three assists in 484 minutes of play in the competition, finishing in a tie for eighth place in the scoring charts.

He left the club in 2012 after six seasons to join the reigning Ukrainian Premier League champions Shakhtar Donetsk. Dević managed to score 64 goals in 148 league appearances for Metalist and 75 from 192 appearances in all competitions.

Shakhtar Donetsk
Dević joined Shakhtar during the 2012–13 Premier League season on a four-year contract for a fee of £4.4 million. Although he had the number 33 at Metalist, he instead took number 18 at Shakhtar as the number 33 shirt was already assigned to Darijo Srna. He made his first appearance for Shakhtar as a 77th-minute substitute for Alex Teixeira in a 2–0 victory over Metalurh Donetsk in the 2012 Super Cup. This success marked Dević's first trophy. His league debut for Shakhtar came in a comprehensive 6–0 victory over Arsenal Kyiv. He came on as a substitute for Alex Teixeira in the 69th minute and scored his first goal for Shakhtar, a penalty, in the 94th minute of the match. His first start came in a commanding 4–0 victory over Volyn Lutsk. He scored the first goal of the match after 4 minutes and added an assist for Henrikh Mkhitaryan. He scored another goal in a 4–1 win against Vorskla.

Return to Metalist
On 28 February 2013, Dević returned to Metalist on a four-year deal.

Russia
On 27 February 2014, Dević signed a four-year deal with Rubin Kazan, where he played 14 games and scored 3 goals. In January 2015, he was sent for a loan to Qatar's Al Rayyan, where he played 18 games and scored 11 goals. He helped his team win promotion to the Qatar Stars League.

On 17 January 2017, Dević signed a 1.5-year deal with a Russian Premier League club FC Rostov. After only six months, Dević left Rostov on 17 June 2017.

Later career
On 7 August 2017, he joined FC Vaduz.

On 4 August 2018, Dević signed a two-year contract with Sabah FC.

On 16 January 2020, Sabah announced the return of Dević on a contract until the end of the 2019–20 season. Dević left Sabah on 24 April 2020.

International career

In June 2008, Dević became a naturalized Ukrainian citizen in hopes of playing for the Ukraine national football team. Although Dević is not the first footballer from outside the former Soviet Union to accept Ukrainian citizenship, his decision has led to numerous discussions in the media on the adoption of foreign players. The first international player to become a naturalized Ukrainian was Mamadi Sangare from Conakry, Guinea, who in 2008 played for FC Desna Chernihiv, and before that FC CSKA Kyiv.

Dević also had a very successful season in 2007–08, scoring 19 goals and becoming top scorer, putting pressure on national team coach Olexiy Mykhailychenko to select him. But Mykhailychenko hesitated, stating that one great season might not be enough to justify Devic's selection for Ukraine. Nonetheless, he did cap Dević for a friendly match against Norway on 19 November 2008, becoming the third naturalized citizen on the Ukraine national football team called up at that time, along with Oleksandr Aliyev and Artem Milevskyi. Dević played the second half of the match and wore the number 10 shirt. In the next couple of years his match participation dropped noticeably, due to his low performance in the Premier League as well as not scoring with the national team.

Dević was a member of Ukraine's squad for UEFA Euro 2012. On 19 June 2012, he was in the starting line-up for the game against England in the final round of games before the quarter-finals. Ukraine lost 0–1, with Wayne Rooney's second-half header carrying England through at the Donbass Arena in Donetsk. However, Dević had a goal disallowed in the second half when John Terry hooked the ball clear off the goal line, as confirmed by video replays. England ultimately won Group D and advanced along with France, while Ukraine were eliminated. Dević's "ghost goal" reopened football's goal-line technology debate. Replays of the build-up also appeared to show Dević's teammate, Artem Milevskyi, who set up Dević, in an offside position when the ball was played to him, although the play was not flagged for offside by match officials. On the following day, however, UEFA and its chief refereeing officer, Pierluigi Collina, delivered their final verdict: match officials had erroneously denied Dević and Ukraine a legitimate goal.

Career statistics

Club

International

International goals
Scores and results list Ukraine's goal tally first.

Honours
Radnički Beograd
Second League of Serbia and Montenegro (1): 2003–04
Shakhtar Donetsk
 Ukrainian Premier League (1): 2012–13
 Ukrainian Cup (1): 2012–13
 Ukrainian Super Cup (1): 2012
Al-Rayyan
Qatari Second Division (1): 2014–15
Vaduz
Liechtenstein Football Cup (1): 2017–18
Individual
 Ukraine Premier League Top Scorer: 2007–08

References

External links

 
 Profile at Metalist's official website 
 

1983 births
Living people
Association football forwards
Association football midfielders
Naturalized citizens of Ukraine
Footballers from Belgrade
Serbian emigrants to Ukraine
Serbia and Montenegro expatriate footballers
Serbian expatriate footballers
Serbian footballers
Ukrainian footballers
Ukraine international footballers
Ukrainian expatriate footballers
FK Zvezdara players
FK Železnik players
FK Radnički Beograd players
FK Voždovac players
FC Metalist Kharkiv players
FC Volyn Lutsk players
FC Shakhtar Donetsk players
FC Rubin Kazan players
FC Rostov players
Al-Rayyan SC players
FC Vaduz players
Sabah FC (Azerbaijan) players
Ukrainian Premier League players
Russian Premier League players
Serbian SuperLiga players
Swiss Challenge League players
Qatari Second Division players
Azerbaijan Premier League players
Serbia and Montenegro expatriate sportspeople in Ukraine
Ukrainian expatriate sportspeople in Qatar
Serbian expatriate sportspeople in Qatar
Expatriate footballers in Ukraine
Expatriate footballers in Qatar
Expatriate footballers in Russia
Ukrainian expatriate sportspeople in Russia
Serbian expatriate sportspeople in Russia
Expatriate footballers in Liechtenstein
Ukrainian expatriate sportspeople in Liechtenstein
Serbian expatriate sportspeople in Liechtenstein
Expatriate footballers in Azerbaijan
Ukrainian expatriate sportspeople in Azerbaijan
Serbian expatriate sportspeople in Azerbaijan
UEFA Euro 2012 players
Ukrainian Premier League top scorers